Marthinus "Tinus" Linee (23 August 1969 – 3 November 2014) was a South African rugby player. Linee played predominantly at centre. He played all his provincial rugby for Western Province. He represented Western Province and the Stormers in Super Rugby. He played nine tour games for the Springboks between 1993 and 1994, but never played in a test for South Africa.

Youth
Linee attended Nederburg Primary School along with his future wife, Diana. Both former Springbok player Chester Williams and former Springbok coach Peter de Villiers attended Nederburg Primary.

Playing career

Provincial
Linee made his debut for Western Province in 1992 and played 112 games for the province until his retirement in 2001. Renowned as a hard-hitting centre, he was a regular starter in the midfield for Western Province. In 2001, future Springbok captain Jean de Villiers made his Western Province debut alongside Tinus Linee.

Linee played alongside Springbok and Western Province legends such as Pieter Rossouw, Chester Williams, Justin Swart, Joel Stransky and Tiaan Strauss as well as French legend Laurent Cabannes. The Sharks won the game 25–17. Linee was also part of the Western Province squad when they won Currie Cup titles in 1997, 2000 and 2001.

Super Rugby
In 1996 Tinus Linee was part of the Western Province team that competed in the Super 12. Western Province failed to qualify for the 1997 Super 12 season and Linee was not part of the squad when the Stormers played in the 1998 Super 12 season. In 1999, he returned to the Cape Town based Super Rugby team's squad, but failed to make the Stormers' Super Rugby squads in 2000 and 2001.

South Africa
In 1993 Linee was picked for the Springboks on their tour to Australia. He made his debut for the Springboks in a tour match against the Victoria national rugby union team in Melbourne on 21 July 1993. At the time, Heinrich Füls and Pieter Muller were the preferred centres for the test matches, so Linee played only in tour games and failed to make the team for the test matches.

He again did not feature in any of the test matches and on 22 November 1994, he played his last tour match for the Springboks against Pontypridd in Pontypridd, Wales.

Coaching career
In 2008 Linee formed part of Western Province's Vodacom Cup team management. In 2012 he was assistant coach at RCM Universitatea Timişoara in Romania alongside head coach and former Springbok teammate, Chester Williams. While being the assistant coach in 2012, RCM Universitatea Timişoara won the SuperLiga CEC Bank, Romania's main domestic rugby competition.

Honours

Playing career
Western Province
Currie Cup: 1997, 2000, 2001

Coaching career
RCM Universitatea Timişoara 
SuperLiga CEC Bank: 2012

Health and death
In April 2013, Linee was diagnosed with motor neurone disease.

His deteriorating health resulted in him having financial difficulties in an attempt to cover his medical costs. This resulted in him auctioning off his Springbok and Western Province blazers to raise money. South African fans have since organised and contributed to several fundraisers to assist him and his family financially. The introduction of a ventilator in April 2014, meant that his condition remained stable without deteriorating. His hands, however, remained virtually paralysed. Linee died on 3 November 2014, aged 45 in his family home in Paarl.

He was survived by his wife Diana, her two sons, and a daughter from his first marriage.

See also
List of South Africa national rugby union players – Springbok no. 591

References

External links
 

1969 births
2014 deaths
Deaths from motor neuron disease
Neurological disease deaths in South Africa
Sportspeople from Paarl
South African rugby union coaches
South African rugby union players
South Africa international rugby union players
Rugby union players from the Western Cape
Rugby union centres
Western Province (rugby union) players